The Big N’ Tasty is a hamburger sold by the international fast food chain McDonald's. It is designed to compete with the Whopper sandwich. A similar variation called the Big Tasty, without the center "N'", which was first released in Saudi Arabia, is sold outside the United States in parts of Europe, South America, South Africa, The Middle East, and Taiwan.

Product description
The Big N' Tasty consists of a seasoned quarter-pound beef meat patty with ketchup, mayonnaise, slivered onions, two dill pickle slices, leaf lettuce, and one tomato slice on a sesame seed bun.

The Big Tasty configuration is somewhat different, consisting of a third-pound (151 g) beef patty,  sesame seed bun, square-cut lettuce, two tomato slices, sliced onions, three slices of Emmental cheese, and Big Tasty sauce (which has a smoke flavor).

The Big Tasty Bacon variant also contains strips of streaky bacon. This variant is not available in the U.S., only internationally.

Variants
Regional variants
 McOz – Beetroot, lettuce, tomato, onion, cheddar cheese, ketchup and mustard. Originally available in Australia, it was then discontinued and replaced with McFeast Deluxe which omitted the beetroot and added mayonnaise and pickles. The McFeast Deluxe was then also discontinued. The McOz was reintroduced on December 28, 2011, but was then replaced by a gourmet Angus beef version of the burger called the Homestyle Oz as part of the Angus burger menu. The ingredients for the Angus version were essentially upmarket versions of the same ingredients, but with the addition of a fried egg and an artisan bun. This version was also discontinued. The original McOz has returned sporadically for limited time offers.
 McXtra – Name of the sandwich in Quebec locations
 The Boss – two quarter pound beef patties (4 oz, 113.4 g; total beef mass of 0.5 lb, 8 oz, 227 g) and a slice of cheese, mayonnaise, ketchup, lettuce, tomato, and onion.  Available in New Zealand.
 Big Tasty – As above, but without the pickles in Argentina, Austria, Brazil, Bulgaria, Chile, Costa Rica, Croatia, Denmark, Ecuador, Egypt, Estonia, Finland, France, Germany, Greece, Guatemala, Israel, Italy, Ivory Coast, Lithuania, Malta, Mexico, Morocco, the Netherlands (until the introduction of the Big Tasty Bacon in 2006), Norway, Czech Republic, Pakistan, Panama, Portugal, Puerto Rico, Romania, Russia, Saudi Arabia, Serbia, Slovakia, South Africa (from 2011), Sweden, Switzerland, Venezuela, Ukraine and the United Kingdom. Uruguay adds 1/3oz. of sliced onions to the original recipe. Limited availability in Poland, Ireland and Luxembourg (until the introduction of the Big Tasty Bacon).
 In South Korea, the Big Tasty ("빅테이스티 버거") contains a hot "chili salsa sauce" (칠리 살사 소스).
 In Malaysia, the Big N' Tasty has a 1/4 pound beef patty, fresh lettuce, pickles, chopped onion, two slices of tomato, a slice of cheese with special sauce and ketchup on a sesame bun
 Big Tasty Bacon – Four strips of bacon are added.Available in the Netherlands, Croatia, Czech Republic, Lithuania, Latvia, Poland, Slovakia, Germany, Switzerland, Malta, Austria, Norway, Denmark, Sweden and in the United Kingdom. Limited availability in Poland, Serbia, France and Russia (Winter) and was sold in a limited time (2018) in Brazil.
 Chicken Tasty – Made with a chicken fillet, without the smoke-flavored sauce. Available in Sweden.
 In Spain, the sandwich is called a McRoyal Deluxe or McRoyal Bacon Deluxe if served with bacon.
 In the UK, the 'Big Cheese' (2007 promotion) featured the bun, patty and cheese from the Big Tasty, removing all other ingredients, but augmented with a new cheesy sauce. The product was removed after the promotion ended.

Discontinued and preceding variants
 Big Xtra – The Big Xtra included the same ingredients as the Big N' Tasty, but the beef patty was seasoned with a spice and salt mixture unique to this burger. The patty was also larger, weighing 4.6 oz. It was quite popular in German McDonald's restaurants. It is still sold in Canadian Wal-Mart McDonald's locations only. (This is no longer sold in all locations).
 McDLT – The McDLT (McDonald's Lettuce and Tomato) was served with mayonnaise, mustard, ketchup, pickles, sliced onions, lettuce, American cheese, and two tomato slices. It was served in a Styrofoam container with two compartments in which one side contained the half with one bun and the hamburger, and the other compartment contained the bun with the cheese and other cold ingredients. It was advertised as a design to keep the hot side hot and the cold side cold.

History

The Big N' Tasty is the latest in a series of burgers that were designed to compete against the Whopper from Burger King. The first sandwich in this line of products was the McDLT, launched in 1984. It was sold in a novel form of packaging where the meat and bottom bun was prepared separately from the lettuce, tomato, cheese, pickles, sauces, and top bun and both were then packaged into a specially designed two-sided container. The consumer was then expected to finalize preparation of it by combining the "hot" and "cool" sides just before eating. The company discontinued it between December 1990 and January 1991 to appear more environmentally friendly as it moved away from polystyrene packaging which was integral to the McDLT "experience".

The McDLT was eventually succeeded by the McLean Deluxe in 1991. This was a lower fat burger that included carrageenan to replace the beef fat in the patty, and was served without mayonnaise. While it tested well, it failed to catch on after the national roll-out and was discontinued in February 1996 in favor of the new Arch Deluxe, an adult oriented burger that featured a higher quality roll and a dijon mustard based mayonnaise. It was also unsuccessful and was discontinued in 1998.

The Big N' Tasty was introduced in 1997 and was originally tested in the California market, while the Big Xtra was test marketed in the Northeastern United States as the MBX; during the simultaneous testing phase, either one could be sold depending upon the test market. The Big N' Tasty was phased in nationally in 2000, displacing the Big Xtra in the United States. The national introduction was done to coincide with the opening of Disney's California Adventure. From 2002 until 2003, the Big N' Tasty was one of the flagship products for the McDonald's Dollar Menu. McDonald's removed the Big N' Tasty from the Dollar Menu on February 1, 2003, so that the Double Cheeseburger could take its place. McDonald's removed the Big N' Tasty from its menu in the United States on January 1, 2011. However, the Big N' Tasty is still on the menu at McDonald's locations in US army and naval bases, including the restaurant at the US Naval Base in Yokosuka.

Advertising
 The McDLT's marketing focused on variations of the theme "Keep the hot side hot, and the cool side cool", in a 1985 commercial released to market featuring Jason Alexander. A subsequent campaign featured singers Aretha Franklin and Jerry Butler.
 The 2001 national introduction of it featured a campaign that starred NBA player Kobe Bryant.
 A 2002 commercial featured Cedric the Entertainer advertising the item, along with the Spicy McChicken, on the Dollar Menu, and featured the Grimace and The Hamburglar on each side of Cedric.
 Due to its bigger patty, the Big Xtra was advertised as being larger than a Whopper.
 There also was a 1985 commercial featuring former NFL Defensive Lineman and Chicago Bears legend William Perry along with teammates from their 85 Super Bowl XX Triumph.
 In the Philippines, a version of the song "Mr. Sandman" with slightly altered lyrics was used in a TV advertisement promoting the Big N' Tasty.

International
The Big N' Tasty was first test marketed under a different name in a limited number of McDonald's restaurants in Sweden during the summer of 2003, followed by a national release during the autumn with the current name. In the UK, it launched in December 2003 with the advertising slogan "Sorry, America, but the Big Tasty is only for us Brits. I'm lovin' it. Sorry you're not". It was phased out of all restaurants in August 2005 as part of the menu clear up that made way for the launch of the Deli Sandwiches. It was reintroduced to the UK menu as part of the limited time offer program in the Autumn of 2006. It was again introduced to the menu in the summers of 2007, 2008, and continues to do so as a promotional item, generally during winter and summer when other food events (such as the World Cup or the company's popular Monopoly promotion) are not running. The Big Tasty returned in January 2013 as part of the January food promotion, and can come with/without bacon, and most recently has been made available with a barbecue sauce option ("Big Tasty BBQ") It was recently removed in Denmark and in the Netherlands for unknown reasons; it was reintroduced in the Netherlands on 2 April 2012. It is still available at all McDonald's restaurants in Latvia, Norway, Greece and the majority of the restaurants in Sweden. The Big N' Tasty was also introduced to the Philippine market.

See also
 McDonald's products

References

McDonald's foods
Products introduced in 1997
Fast food hamburgers